The Texas Marshal is a 1941 American Western film directed by Sam Newfield and written by William Lively. The film stars Tim McCoy, Art Davis, Kay Leslie, Karl Hackett, Edward Peil Sr. and Charles King. The film was released on July 13, 1941, by Producers Releasing Corporation.

Plot
A rancher has been killed near the town of Cactus Creek. Marshall Tim is called to investigate the murder and find other ranchers that have gone missing. After comparing bullets, Tim finds a match in Moore's henchmen and finds tin ore samples and suspicious deeds in his safe.

Cast          
Tim McCoy as Trigger Tim Rand
Art Davis as Art Davis
Kay Leslie as Marge Adams
Karl Hackett as Ernest Moore
Edward Peil Sr. as Sam Adams
Charles King as Ray Titus
Dave O'Brien as Buzz Weston
Budd Buster as Henderson
John Elliott as John Gorham
Wilson Edwards as Radio Announcer
Byron Vance as Deputy Bill
Gene Haas as Rhythm Riders Band Member 
Ace Dehne as Rhythm Riders Band Member 
Rusty Cline as Rhythm Riders Band Member 
Tony Fiore as Rhythm Riders Band Member

References

External links
 

1941 films
American Western (genre) films
1941 Western (genre) films
Producers Releasing Corporation films
Films directed by Sam Newfield
American black-and-white films
1940s English-language films
1940s American films